Austfjorden is a fjord in Vestland county, Norway. It starts in Alver and extends to the northwest. The Masfjorden joins the Austfjorden from the north, and then the Austfjorden empties into the Fensfjorden before reaching the open sea near Fedje. The Austfjorden is the innermost arm of the Fensfjorden. The village of Knarrviki and the Mongstad industrial area lie on the western shore of the Austfjorden. The village of Myking lies on the western shore of the fjord, near the innermost part of the fjord.

On the north side of the Austfjorden there are several deep bays. The next two are Nordkvingevågen with a harbor area at the village of Nordkvingo and Sørekvingevågen with a harbor at the village of Sørkvingo. Between these two lies the cape Melshovden. A little further south into the fjord is the Kjekallevågen bay where there is a causeway and a bridge at the mouth of the bay. The village of Ostereidet lies on the isthmus.

See also
 List of Norwegian fjords

References

Fjords of Vestland
Alver (municipality)
Masfjorden